The 2013 World Snowshoe Championships was the 6th edition of the global snowshoe running competition, World Snowshoe Championships, organised by the World Snowshoe Federation and took place in Fondo on 6 January 2013.

Results
The race Ciaspolada, held on the distance of 5.6 km, has compiled two different ranking (male and female) overall, it was the mass start system and more than 100 competitors participated.

Men's overall

Women's overall

References

External links
 World Snowshoe Federation official web site

World Snowshoe Championships